Qeshlaq-e Qitranlu Hajj Mohammad Kandi (also Romanized as Qeshlāq-e Qīṭrānlū Ḩājj Moḩammad Kandī) is a village in Qeshlaq-e Shomali Rural District, in the Central District of Parsabad County, Ardabil Province, Iran. At the 2006 census, its population was 462, in 107 families.

References 

Towns and villages in Parsabad County